Joseph Richardson (28 February 1878 – 13 June 1951) was an Australian cricketer. He played in two first-class matches for South Australia in 1905/06.

See also
 List of South Australian representative cricketers

References

External links
 

1878 births
1951 deaths
Australian cricketers
South Australia cricketers
Cricketers from Adelaide